False River is an oxbow lake located in southeastern Pointe Coupee Parish, Louisiana centered at  This lake was once the main channel of the Mississippi River in this area, but was cut off in about 1722 when seasonal flooding cut a shorter channel to the east.

History
Pierre Le Moyne d'Iberville and his party bypassed False River to shorten their route up-river.

During the American Civil War, an expedition was sent from Morganza with five squadrons from the Second New York Cavalry to scout the area around the False River for Confederate recruiting officers. Marching through heavy rainstorms the expedition reached New Roads on January 31, 1865. Here five officers were found hiding in closets or under houses.

Recreation
 
False River has often held the state record for the largest bass caught, and has the largest number of striped bass per acre in the state.

Additionally, water sports including boating, sailing, and water skiing may be enjoyed in the clean, sparkling waters of the lake. A number of commercial establishments provide launch facilities, boat rentals, supplies, and concessions. There are also many restaurants, bar & grills, antique shops, and bed & breakfast accommodations in the area.

During duck hunting season, waterfowl may be legally harvested by the public in an area near Jarreau and Oscar, Louisiana known as "the south flats". Several private duck blinds have been erected in this area, but most duck hunters tend to simply anchor off their boats in the shallow water of the flats.

Located on the northern end of the lake is the city of New Roads. A free public boat launch, barbecue and picnic facilities, a fishing pier and gazebo may be found at the end of Morrison Parkway, near City Hall and the downtown area. Another boat launch, open to the public for a launching fee, is located on the southern end of the lake in Jarreau. This launch, which is the most accessible when coming to the area from Baton Rouge, Louisiana is located on the Island side of False River on Louisiana Highway 413. Other paid launching facilities include Bergeron's Campground near Lakeland, Bueche's Bar & Grill located near Ventress, Jim's Place located in Ventress, The Sand Bar (also home of Pelican Yacht Club) in Oscar, Louisiana, and the Point Breeze Motel on False River Drive (LA-1) in New Roads.

In popular culture
The lake can be seen in the 2002 film The Badge.

References

External links 
 False River Community Site

Lakes of Louisiana
Oxbow lakes of the United States
Baton Rouge metropolitan area
Bodies of water of Pointe Coupee Parish, Louisiana
Tourist attractions in Pointe Coupee Parish, Louisiana